Evelynn may refer to:

Evelynn, Agony's Embrace, a playable champion character in the video game League of Legends and its associated virtual band K/DA
Evelynn (band), an American band of the 1990s and 2000s

People with the name
Evelynn M. Hammonds (born 1950), American feminist scholar
Evlynn Smith (birth name Evelynn Anne Smith; 1962–2003), Scottish artist
Ewelina Lisowska (born 1991), Polish singer who uses the stage name Evelynn Nurth

See also
Evelyn (disambiguation)
Evelyn (name)